MG2 (formerly MulvannyG2 Architecture) is an architecture firm based in Seattle, Washington, United States. MG2 is ranked among the 50 largest architectural firms and top two retail designers in the world. The firm designs retail stores and centers, corporate offices and interiors, and mixed-use destinations for clients and brands of global significance. Clients include seven of the top 20 Fortune 100 retailers.

Founded in 1971, the firm employs over 400 in six offices located in: Seattle, Washington; Irvine, California; Washington, D.C.; New York City, NY; Minneapolis, MN; and Shanghai, China. Since 2015, it has been led by CEO and chairman Mitch Smith and president Russ Hazzard. As of 2013, MG2 is the third-largest architecture firm in the Puget Sound region by annual revenue, behind Callison and NBBJ.

In May 2015, the firm changed its name to MG2 and moved its headquarters from Bellevue, Washington to 1101 Second Avenue in Downtown Seattle.

Notable projects
Tower 12, Seattle, Washington, 2017
1101 Westlake, Seattle, Washington, 2016
MG2 Headquarters, Seattle, Washington, 2015
Uniqlo flagship store, Boston, Massachusetts, 2015
Emerald City Commons, Seattle, Washington, 2013
Tonkon Torp, LLP, Portland, Oregon, 2011
Trolley Square, Salt Lake City, Utah, 2011
Bellevue Towers, Bellevue, Washington, 2009
Hyatt at Olive 8, Seattle, Washington, 2009
Escala at 4th & Virginia, Seattle, Washington, 2009
Fashion Place, Murray, Utah, 2007
Fujian Provincial Electric and Power Company Headquarters, Fuzhou, China, 2007
Redmond City Hall, Redmond, Washington, 2006
Tacoma Convention Center, Tacoma, Washington, 2004
Shanghai Fudan Crown Plaza Hotel, Shanghai, China, 2005
China Construction Bank, Xiamen, China, 2003
Seattle Grand Hyatt Hotel, Seattle, Washington, 2001

References

Further reading

"Fred Meyer, Portland, Ore." Chain Store Age, November 2010.

"From Stockroom to Showroom." Visual Merchandising + Store Design, vmsd.com, October 2010.

"The Hybrid Market." Visual Merchandising + Store Design, vmsd.com, September 2010.

"Create a Community: Ideas for Attracting GenY." Visual Merchandising + Store Design, vmsd.com, August 2010.

"Avoid the Slump: Retail Design Strategies for Tapping the Buying Power of GenX and GenY." Visual Merchandising + Store Design, vmsd.com, July 2010.

"Can a bold new "eco-city" clear the air in China?" The Seattle Times, December 10, 2007.

External links
 MG2 corporate site

Architecture firms based in Washington (state)